"I'll Never Get Enough of You" is a song by Australian singer Samantha Sang from her 1979 album, From Dance to Love. 
It was written by Jeanne Napoli, Gary Portnoy and Judy Quay.

Air Supply version
"I'll Never Get Enough of You" was covered in 1981 by English/Australian soft rock duo Air Supply on their sixth album, The One That You Love.

The LP had previously produced three top 5 singles in the United States. Since the group already had another album pending, "I'll Never Get Enough of You" was not released as a fourth single in either North America or Europe. However, the label released the single in East Asia, including Japan, where it became a top 10 hit in late 1981.

References

External links
 

1979 songs
1981 singles
Samantha Sang songs
Air Supply songs
Song recordings produced by Harry Maslin
Song recordings produced by Tony Bongiovi
Arista Records singles
1970s ballads